Colonia Barón is a town in the Quemú Quemú Department of La Pampa Province in Argentina.

People
The speedway rider Coty Garcia is from the town.

References

External links

Populated places in La Pampa Province